Manassas City Public Schools is a school division that serves the city of Manassas, Virginia, United States.

Administration

Superintendent 
The superintendent of Manassas City Public Schools is Kevin Newman. He became superintendent on July 2, 2018. Newman previously served as the superintendent of Colonial Beach Public Schools. He was also a principal in King George County Schools, and in Colonial Beach.

School Board 
There are 7 members of the Manassas City School Board and 2 student representatives.

 Suzanne W. Seaberg, Chair
 Lisa A. Stevens, Vice-Chair
 Christina Brooks
 Carl Hollingsworth
 Alex Iqbal
 Jill Spall
 Robyn R. Williams
 Veniel Dabipi, Student Representative       
 Laayba Tanoli, Student Representative

Schools
There are 9 schools in the district: 5 elementary schools, 2 intermediate schools, one middle school, and one high school. All schools are located in the city of Manassas.

Elementary schools (PreK-4) 
Baldwin Elementary School

 Principal: Dave Rupert
 Mascot: Rockets

Jennie Dean Elementary School 

 Principal: Brian Coleman
 Mascot: Dolphins

R.C. Haydon Elementary School

 Principal: Karis Brooks
 Mascot: Hawks

George C. Round Elementary School

 Principal: Andrew Wilson
 Mascot: Raccoons

Weems Elementary School

 Principal: Michele Hupman
 Mascot: Wildcats

Intermediate Schools (5-6) 
Baldwin Intermediate School

 Principal: Juliet Finnegan
 Mascot: Huskies

Mayfield Intermediate School

 Principal: Donald J. Frischkorn, Jr.
 Mascot: Bobcats

Middle School (7-8) 
Grace E. Metz Middle School
Principal:  Gary M. Morris
Mascot: Mustangs

High School (9-12)
Osbourn High School
 Principal: Mr. Michael Pflugrath
 Mascot: Eagles

References

External links
 Manassas City Public Schools (official site)

School divisions in Virginia
Manassas, Virginia